Vice Admiral Sir Stephen Ferrier Berthon  (24 August 1922 – 30 January 2007) was a Royal Navy officer who became Deputy Chief of the Defence Staff (Operational Requirements).

Naval career
Educated at The Old Malthouse School and the Royal Naval College, Dartmouth, Berthon joined the Royal Navy in 1940 and saw action during World War II. He joined the Joint Planning Staff at the Admiralty in 1961, became naval attaché in Australia in 1964 before being appointed Director of Defence Policy at the Ministry of Defence in 1968. He went on to be Commodore at the Naval base HMS Drake in 1971, Flag Officer Medway and Port Admiral Chatham in 1974 and Assistant Chief of the Naval Staff (Operational Requirements) in 1976, before finishing as Deputy Chief of the Defence Staff (Operational Requirements) in 1978 and retiring in 1981.

Family
In 1948 he married Elizabeth Leigh-Bennett; they had two sons and two daughters.

References

1922 births
2007 deaths
Royal Navy vice admirals
Knights Commander of the Order of the Bath